|}

The Prix du Prince d'Orange is a group-3 flat horse race in France open to three-year-old thoroughbreds. It is run at Longchamp over a distance of 2,000 metres (about 1¼ miles), and it is scheduled to take place each year in September.

History
The event is named after William of Orange (1840–1879), the eldest son of William III of the Netherlands. The Prince became a member of the Jockey-Club de Paris in 1863, and took up racehorse ownership shortly before his death.

The Prix du Prince d'Orange was established in 1882. It was originally open to horses aged three or older and contested at Longchamp over 2,400 metres.

The race was abandoned throughout World War I, with no running from 1914 to 1918. It was cancelled twice during World War II, in 1939 and 1940. It was run at Le Tremblay over 2,200 metres in 1943 and 1944.

The event's regular distance was cut to 2,200 metres in 1963. It was shortened to 2,000 metres in 1972. The race was restricted to three-year-olds in 1994.

The Prix du Prince d'Orange sometimes serves as a trial for the Prix de l'Arc de Triomphe. Five horses have won both races in the same year. The first was Ksar in 1922, and the most recent was Saumarez in 1990.

Records
Most successful horse (2 wins):
 Azur – 1883, 1884
 Fra Angelico – 1892, 1893
 Omnium II – 1895, 1896
 Biniou – 1908, 1909
 Cadum – 1924, 1925
 Motrico – 1930, 1932
 Tanerko – 1956, 1957
 Lovely Dancer – 1983, 1984

Leading jockey (6 wins):
 George Stern – Caius (1904), Biniou (1908, 1909), Gros Papa (1910, dead-heat), Floraison (1912), Dagor (1913)
 Freddy Head – Goodly (1969), Hallez (1971), Ivanjica (1976), Carwhite (1977), Lovely Dancer (1983), Triptych (1988)

Leading trainer (8 wins):
 André Fabre – Cariellor (1985, dead-heat), In the Wings (1989), Arcangues (1992), Apple Tree (1993), Loup Sauvage (1997), State Shinto (1999), Prince Bishop (2010), Intello (2013)

Leading owner (5 wins):
 Édouard de Rothschild – Floraison (1912), Cadum (1924, 1925), Brantome (1935), Gonfalonier (1937)

Winners since 1976

Earlier winners

 1882: Octave
 1883: Azur
 1884: Azur
 1885: Plaisanterie
 1886: Fricandeau
 1887: Tenebreuse
 1888: Athos
 1889: Achille
 1890: Wandora
 1891: Espion
 1892: Fra Angelico
 1893: Fra Angelico
 1894: Ravioli
 1895: Omnium II
 1896: Omnium II
 1897: Launay
 1898: Gardefeu
 1899: Jeanne Brunette
 1900: Fourire
 1901: Arkinglass
 1902: La Camargo
 1903: Maximum
 1904: Caius
 1905: Presto
 1906: Montlieu
 1907: Bethsaida
 1908: Biniou
 1909: Biniou
 1910: Gros Papa / Ronde de Nuit *
 1911: Alcantara
 1912: Floraison
 1913: Dagor
 1914–18: no race
 1919: Tullamore
 1920: Cid Campeador
 1921: Harpocrate
 1922: Ksar
 1923: Guercoeur
 1924: Cadum
 1925: Cadum
 1926: Masked Ruler
 1927: Sac a Papier
 1928: Finglas
 1929: Kantar
 1930: Motrico
 1931: Lovelace
 1932: Motrico
 1933: Phlegeton
 1934: Negundo
 1935: Brantome
 1936: Arkina
 1937: Gonfalonier
 1938: Vatellor
 1939: no race
 1940: no race
 1941: Macaron
 1942: Le Pacha
 1943: Guirlande / Norseman *
 1944: Folle Nuit
 1945: Micipsa
 1946: Achille
 1947: Oviedo
 1948: Yong Lo
 1949:
 1950: Medium
 1951: Florian
 1952: Silnet
 1953: Worden
 1954: Banassa
 1955: Cordova
 1956: Tanerko
 1957: Tanerko
 1958: Chief
 1959: Herbager
 1960: Charlottesville
 1961: Wordpam
 1962: Kistinie
 1963: Soltikoff
 1964: Le Fabuleux
 1965: Diatome
 1966: Pasquin
 1967: Carmarthen
 1968: Petrone
 1969: Goodly
 1970: A Chara
 1971: Hallez
 1972: Mister Sic Top
 1973: Toujours Pret
 1974: On My Way
 1975: Kasteel
</div>
* The 1910 and 1943 races were dead-heats and have joint winners.

See also
 List of French flat horse races

References
 France Galop / Racing Post:
 france-galop.com – A Brief History: Prix du Prince d'Orange.
 galopp-sieger.de – Prix du Prince d'Orange.
 horseracingintfed.com – International Federation of Horseracing Authorities – Prix du Prince d'Orange (2016).
 pedigreequery.com – Prix du Prince d'Orange – Longchamp.

Flat horse races for three-year-olds
Longchamp Racecourse
Horse races in France
Recurring sporting events established in 1882